Illovszky Rudolf Stadion was a multi-use stadium in Angyalföld, Budapest, Hungary. It was used mostly for football matches and was the home stadium of Vasas SC. The stadium was able to hold 18,000 people.

History
In the 1970–71 Nemzeti Bajnokság I season an electronic scoreboard was mounted.

On 2 June 1990, the first official international match was played in the stadium. Hungary hosted Columbia. The friendly match ended with a 3–1 victory for Hungary. The first goal was scored by György Bognár.

On 3 June 2000, the last international football match was played. Hungary hosted Israel. The final result was 2–1 for Hungary, while the last goals was scored by Ferenc Horváth.

In July 2001 the plastic roof of the main stand was burnt. The damaged part was 30 metres long.

On 21 February 2002 the stadium was named after Vasas SC legend Rudolf Illovszky.

On 29 October 2016, the last match was played in the stadium. Vasas hosted Videoton in the 2016–17 Nemzeti Bajnokság I season. The match ended with 1–1 draw and the last goal was scored by Lazović in the 92nd minute.

Demolition
The stadium was demolished in 2016 to build a completely new football stadium.

Milestone matches

International matches

Attendances
As of 11 April 2017.

Gallery

References

External links
Stadion Rudolf Illovszky at magyarfutball.hu

Football venues in Hungary
Vasas SC
Sports venues in Budapest
Demolished buildings and structures in Hungary
Sports venues demolished in 2016